Gooseberry Lake is a lake in the Canadian province of Saskatchewan. It is a shallow, natural lake located north-west of Moose Mountain Lake in the Moose Mountain Creek watershed. The lake has a large catchment area and flows into Moose Mountain Lake via the east flowing Gooseberry Creek. It is in the Prairies Ecozone of Palliser's Triangle and the area around the lake has a knob and kettle landscape with poor drainage that, during years with heavy spring run-off or rains, is known to flood.

The lake is in the RM of Golden West No. 95 and can be accessed from Highway 711. There are no settlements, facilities, nor amenities on the lake.

Dry Lake Drainage Project 
In 2017, then Environment Minister and now Premier of Saskatchewan, Scott Moe, announced the Dry Lake Drainage Project in the Gooseberry Lake watershed.

Dry Lake is a small, shallow lake north of Gooseberry Lake. Its watershed is north of Gooseberry Lake and west Moose Mountain Creek. A small arroyo creek flows from Dry Lake south to Gooseberry Lake. This project gives more control to local farmers regarding flood control and drainage in the Dry Lake area of the Gooseberry Lake watershed.

It gives farmers control over thirty gated culverts that will help funnel excess water off fields and into Moose Mountain Creek. The culverts can also hold water back when the river levels are high. The project also restored  of wetland on existing drainage and almost  of wetland retention on new drainage.

See also 
List of lakes of Saskatchewan
Geography of Saskatchewan

References 

Lakes of Saskatchewan
Golden West No. 95, Saskatchewan
Kettle lakes in Canada